Nous (stylized N O U S) is an EP by singer-songwriter Diane Birch, her third EP released and her first independent release, released through bandcamp on January 31, 2016, and by iTunes on March 22, 2016. The album was written and recorded mostly in Berlin, recorded at Vox-Ton Studios, Joy Sound Studio, and Hympatia, mixed by Birch at Hymnpatia, and mastered by Nene Baratto at Big Snuff Studio in Berlin. Birch found in Berlin that she could make music for art, not money, unlike New York, where she felt money was the driving force. Birch was struck by the openness and generosity of the musicians she met in Berlin who were friends and acquaintances of a new friend of hers, drummer Max Weissenfeldt, and she was able to rediscover her creativity. However, she still considers New York to be her home, needing to return even after needing to leave.

The album title is derived from a Greek word meaning "mind" or "intellect" but most commonly used as "common sense", "awareness", or "consciousness", and also "us" in French. Birch was drawn by the multifaceted nature of the word. The album deals with issues of love, power, gender, and loss, using hymns, moody soul, and RnB. The two stand-out songs of the album are "Stand Under My Love" and "Walk on Water".

Track listing

Personnel 
Musicians
Diane Birch: vocals, piano, keyboards, programming
Max Weissenfeldt: drums
Stuart Matthewman: tenor saxophone
Claudio Jolowicz: flute, tenor saxophone
Fabian Engwicht: trumpet
Yoed Nir: strings

Production
Diane Birch: Producer, arranged by, engineer, mixed by
Nene Baratto (at Big Snuff Studio): mixed by, mastered by 
Antonio Pulli (at Vox-Ton): recorded by, engineer
Benjamin Spitzmüller (at Joy Sound Studio): recorded by, mixed by
Meshakai Wolf: album photography and design

References

External links 
 Diane Birch (official site)

2016 EPs
Diane Birch albums